Graptodytes is a genus of beetles in family Dytiscidae. It contains the following species:

 Graptodytes aequalis (Zimmermann, 1918)
 Graptodytes atlantis (Théry, 1933)
 Graptodytes aurasius (Jeannel, 1907)
 Graptodytes bilineatus (Sturm, 1835)
 Graptodytes bremondi Guignot, 1934
 Graptodytes bussleri Fery, 1994
 Graptodytes castilianus Fery, 1995
 Graptodytes delectus (Wollaston, 1864)
 Graptodytes eremitus Ribera & Faille, 2010
 Graptodytes flavipes (Olivier, 1795)
 Graptodytes fractus (Sharp, 1882)
 Graptodytes granularis (Linnaeus, 1767)
 Graptodytes ignotus (Mulsant & Rey, 1861)
 Graptodytes kuchtai (Breit, 1908)
 Graptodytes parisii Gridelli, 1939
 Graptodytes pictus (Fabricius, 1787)
 Graptodytes pietrii Normand, 1933
 Graptodytes sedilloti (Régimbart, 1878)
 Graptodytes siculus Fery, 1995
 Graptodytes snizeki Hendrich, 1993
 Graptodytes varius (Aubé, 1838)
 Graptodytes veterator (Zimmermann, 1918)

References

Dytiscidae genera
Taxonomy articles created by Polbot